Paradmete curta is a species of sea snail, a marine gastropod mollusk in the family Volutomitridae.

Description

Distribution

References

 Engl, W. (2012). Shells of Antarctica. Hackenheim: Conchbooks. 402 pp

External links
 Griffiths, H.J.; Linse, K.; Crame, J.A. (2003). SOMBASE - Southern Ocean mollusc database: a tool for biogeographic analysis in diversity and evolution. Organisms Diversity and Evolution. 3: 207-213

Volutomitridae
Gastropods described in 1908